The 1st Foot Cavalry Division was a French Army formation during World War I.

Heads of the  Foot Cavalry Division 
1 January 1918 – 16 February 1919 (dissolution of the  DCP): Général Brécard

First World War 

The  foot cavalry division was formed in December 1917, in the region of Vic-sur-Aisne, with parts of the  D.I.

Composition during the War 

  Foot Cuirassier Regiment from January to November 1918
  Foot Cuirassiers Regiment from December 1917 to November 1918
  Foot Cuirassier Regiment from December 1917 to November 1918
  Territorial Infantry Regiment from December 1917 to November 1918

1918

10 January – 14 March 1918
 Constitution of the region of Vic-sur-Aisne; instruction.
14 – 22 March 1918
 Movement to Chamant.
22 March – 3 April 1918
 Transport by train to Salency ; relieved by the British army.
 Engaged in the  Battle of Picardy : defence of the Crozat Canal, fought and retreated to defend parts of the Oise, towards Varesnes and Pontoise.
3 – 30 April 1918
 Retreat from the front, movement to Ribécourt-Dreslincourt; work.
30 April – 14 June 1918
 Occupation of parts of Thiescourt and Plessis-de-Roye.
 9 June, engaged in the Battle of Matz: defence of parts of Matz and the Oise.
14 June – 3 July 1918
 Retreat from the front, transport by van to Clermont, in Châlons-sur-Marne, followed by movement to Sainte-Menehould ; instruction.
3 July – 10 October 1918
 Occupation of the area between Ville-sur-Tourbe and the Aisne, expanded to the right on 15 July, to the woods of Hauzy and Beaurain
 21 July, extension of the front, to the left to Massiges.
 21 August, reduction to the right, up to the Aisne.
 24 September, movement along the road, until 26 September, engaged, between the Aisne and Vienne-le-Château, in the Battle of Somme-Py (Meuse-Argonne Offensive) and exploitation : Servon and Binarville; progression directly to Lançon.
10–16 October 1918
 Retreat from the front ; moved west to Sainte-Menehould.
16 October – 3 November 1918
 Movement to the front ; from 18th, occupation of the front of the battle at Termes and the East of Olizy.
 Engaged until  November in the Battle of Chesne.
3 – 11 November 1918
 Retreat from the front, rest in Valmy

Attachments 
Organic attachment:  Cavalry Corps from January to November 1918

Third Army
15–17 January 1918
11 February – 21 March 1918
23 – 25 March 1918
4 April – 15 June 1918
Fourth Army
16 June – 11 November 1918
Sixth Army
18 January – 10 February 1918
22 March 1918
26 March – 3 April 1918 (from 25 March to 2 April 1918, the 1st DCP took part in the Grégoire group of the  DI, the 5th CA, and the 35th CA)

Cavalry, 1st
Cavalry divisions of France